Volker Gerhardt (born July 21, 1944) is a German philosopher. He specializes in ethics, political philosophy, aesthetics, metaphysics and theology. His historical studies are centered on Plato, Kant and Nietzsche but have also dealt with Hegel, Marx, Jaspers, Voegelin, Hannah Arendt, Carl Schmitt and others.

Volker Gerhardt studied philosophy, psychology and law in Frankfurt and Münster. He obtained his doctorate at Münster, and received his Habilitation there in 1984.

In 1985 Gerhardt became Professor of Philosophy at Münster. From 1988 to 1992 he led the Institute of Philosophy at the Deutsche Sporthochschule Köln. In 1992 he became Professor for Practical Philosophy at the Humboldt University in Berlin.

Other activities
 German Ethics Council, Member (2008-2012)

Writings 
 Pathos und Distanz: Studien zur Philosophie Friedrich Nietzsches. Reclam, Stuttgart 1988. .
 Friedrich Nietzsche. Beck, München 4. Auflage 2006. .
 Immanuel Kants Entwurf 'Zum ewigen Frieden'. Eine Theorie der Politik. Wissenschaftliche Buchgesellschaft, Darmstadt 1999. .
 Vom Willen zur Macht. Anthropologie und Metaphysik der Macht am exemplarischen Fall Friedrich Nietzsches. de Gruyter, Berlin,  New York 1996. .
 Selbstbestimmung: Das Prinzip der Individualität. Reclam, Stuttgart 1999. .
 Individualität. Das Element der Welt. Beck, München 2000. .
 Der Mensch wird geboren. Kleine Apologie der Humanität. Beck, München 2002. .
 Immanuel Kant: Vernunft und Leben. Reclam, Stuttgart 2002. .
 Die angeborene Würde des Menschen: Aufsätze zur Biopolitik. Parerga, Berlin 2003. .
 Partizipation. Das Prinzip der Politik. Beck, München 2007, . Buchbesprechung von Frank Hahn
 Exemplarisches Denken: Aufsätze aus dem Merkur. Fink Verlag, München 2008. .
 Existentieller Liberalismus: Beiträge zur Politischen Philosophie und zum politischen Zeitgeschehen, Hrsg. Héctor Wittwer. Duncker & Humblot, Berlin 2009. .
 Die Funken des freien Geistes: Neuere Aufsätze zu Nietzsches Philosophie der Zukunft, Hrsg. J.-Ch. Heilinger und N. Loukidelis. de Gruyter, Berlin 2011. .
 Der Sinn des Sinns: Versuch über das Göttliche, C. H. Beck, München 2014. .

References

External links 
 
 Homepage at the Institute for Philosophy at the HU Berlin
 Inaugural Lecture of June 30, 1993, at the Humboldt University Berlin
 Einstein-Forum-Video with Volker Gerhardt

1944 births
20th-century German philosophers
Living people
German male writers